Jhon Jairo Cifuente Vergara (born 23 July 1992) is an Ecuadorian footballer who plays for Barcelona SC as a forward.

Club career

Early career
Cifuente was born in Esmeraldas, and represented Olmedo and Deportivo Quito as a youth. In 2011 he joined Segunda Categoría side CD Juventud Minera, where he appeared and scored regularly.

Macará
On 18 February 2015, Cifuente signed for Macará in Serie B. He scored his first goal as a professional on 22 March in a 3–3 home draw against Técnico Universitario, and finished the season with 11 goals in 34 appearances.

Universidad Católica
On 19 July 2016, Cifuente was transferred to Serie A side Universidad Católica, with his former side retaining half of his federative rights. He made his debut in the category on 6 August, coming on as a second-half substitute in a 1–0 home win over Emelec.

Cifuente scored his first goals in the main category of Ecuadorian football on 15 October 2016, netting four times in a 6–1 home routing of Mushuc Runa. The following 30 May, he scored a hat-trick in a 3–0 Copa Sudamericana home defeat of Petrolero.

Cifuente ended the 2018 campaign as the topscorer with 37 goals, eight ahead of Brayan Angulo.

Pyramids
On 20 December 2018, Cifuente moved abroad for the first time in his career after agreeing to a contract with Egyptian Premier League side Pyramids FC.

International career
Cifuente made his full international debut for Ecuador on 8 June 2017, replacing Enner Valencia late into a 1–1 friendly draw against Venezuela at the FAU Stadium in Boca Raton, Florida. He scored his first international goal five days later, netting the opener in a 3–0 home success over El Salvador.

Career statistics

Club

International

International goals
Scores and results list Ecuador's goal tally first.

Honours

Individual
Ecuadorian Segunda Categoría top goalscorer: 2014 (28 goals)
Copa Sudamericana top goalscorer: 2017 (5 goals)

References

External links

Jhon Cifuente at Footballdatabase

1992 births
Living people
Sportspeople from Esmeraldas, Ecuador
Ecuadorian footballers
Ecuadorian expatriate footballers
Association football forwards
Ecuadorian Serie A players
Ecuadorian Serie B players
Egyptian Premier League players
C.S.D. Macará footballers
C.D. Universidad Católica del Ecuador footballers
Pyramids FC players
Ecuador international footballers
Expatriate footballers in Egypt